Lourdes Oyarbide Jiménez (born 8 April 1994) is a Spanish racing cyclist, who currently rides for UCI Women's WorldTeam . She represented Spain at the 2014 UCI Road World Championships in the women's time trial.

Major results

2012
 10th Time trial, UCI Junior Road World Championships
2017
 1st  Time trial, National Road Championships
2019
 National Road Championships
1st  Road race
2nd Time trial
 1st Stage 4 Vuelta a Burgos Feminas
 3rd Overall Thüringen Ladies Tour
 6th Donostia San Sebastian Klasikoa
2021
 3rd Time trial, National Road Championships
 4th Overall Belgium Tour

References

External links
 

1994 births
Living people
Spanish female cyclists
Sportspeople from Álava
Cyclists from the Basque Country (autonomous community)
21st-century Spanish women